The Connecticut Sun are an American professional basketball team based in Uncasville, Connecticut that competes in the Eastern Conference of the Women's National Basketball Association (WNBA).

The team was established as the Orlando Miracle in 1999, during the league's expansion from ten to twelve teams, as a sister team to the NBA's Orlando Magic. In 2003, as financial strains left the team on the brink of disbanding, the Mohegan Indian tribe purchased and relocated the team to Mohegan Sun, becoming the first Native American tribe to own a professional sports franchise. The team's name comes from its affiliation with Mohegan Sun and its logo is reflective of a modern interpretation of an ancient Mohegan symbol. Capitalizing on the popularity of women's basketball in the state, as a result of the success of the UConn Huskies, the Sun held the distinction of being the only WNBA franchise not to share its market with an NBA team, until the relocation of the Seattle SuperSonics in 2008 left the Storm as an independent team in Seattle.

The Sun have qualified for the WNBA Playoffs in twelve of their eighteen seasons in Connecticut.

History

Orlando Miracle (1999–2002)

Before the franchise relocated to Connecticut in 2003, the team operated as the Orlando Miracle. The Miracle played their home games at TD Waterhouse Centre in Orlando, Florida, as the sister team of the Orlando Magic. After the 2002 season, the NBA sold off all of the WNBA franchises to the operators of the respective teams, which placed the league in the middle of team contractions, relocations, and potential labor strife. Since Magic ownership was no longer interested in retaining the rights to the Miracle and no local partnership was reached, the organization ceased operations and was purchased by the Mohegan Tribe. On January 28, 2003, it was announced that the Miracle would immediately move to Uncasville, Connecticut and change its nickname to the Sun (in reference to the Mohegan Sun casino). The Sun's nickname, color scheme and logo are similar to that of another defunct Florida-based franchise, the Miami Sol, which folded at the same time as the Miracle's relocation to Connecticut.

Relocation and ascendancy to prominence (2003–2004)

With a new home in Uncasville and two former UConn Huskies on the roster, the Sun entered the 2003 season looking to build upon a 2002 campaign in which they missed the playoffs due to a tiebreaker with Indiana. The Sun underwent a total overhaul during the off-season – selecting Debbie Black in the dispersal draft and acquiring former Connecticut star Rebecca Lobo to add another local attraction to join Nykesha Sales. General manager Chris Sienko named Mike Thibault, a coaching veteran with two NBA titles as an assistant coach for the Los Angeles Lakers, as the first head coach for the franchise.

On May 24, 2003, the Sun hosted the first regular season game of its inaugural season, which was shown on ABC, the league's new broadcast partner. The Sun yielded to the two-time defending champion Sparks before a sellout crowd of 9,341. At the conclusion of the 2003 season, the Sun finished with an 18–16 record, which clinched the first playoff berth since the franchise relocated. The Sun swept the second-seeded Sting in the first round of the playoffs, and before being swept by the Detroit Shock in the Eastern Conference Finals.

Rebecca Lobo announced her retirement after seven seasons in the WNBA. The Sun returned Katie Douglas, Nykesha Sales and Taj McWilliams-Franklin, the group that formed Thibault's nucleus. General manager Chris Sienko fortified that core with former UConn product Asjha Jones, who was acquired in a three-team trade, and Minnesota Golden Gophers phenom Lindsay Whalen, who was taken with the fourth overall pick in the 2004 Draft. The Sun managed to snag a top pick in one of the deepest draft classes in league history by trading perennial all-star point guard Shannon Johnson, a move that was universally panned by Sun fans. The Sun selected Lindsay Whalen amidst rumors they would trade her to the Minnesota Lynx. However, she remained on the team as the Sun posted an 18–16 record in an equally-talented Eastern Conference, winning the #1 seed. In the first round, the Sun defeated the Washington Mystics 2–1. In the Eastern Conference Finals, the Sun rolled on, sweeping the New York Liberty. The Sun had made it to the WNBA Finals in their second season of existence. In the Finals, their run would end, as they lost a hard-fought three-game series, 2–1, to the Seattle Storm.

Dynastic turmoil (2005–2007)
In the 2005 off season, the Sun acquired 7'2" (2.18 m) center Margo Dydek. With a dominant post presence, the Sun controlled the Eastern Conference, posting a 26–8 record, the best regular season record for an Eastern Conference team in WNBA history. In the playoffs, the Sun flew to the finals, sweeping the Detroit Shock and the Indiana Fever. In the 2005 WNBA Finals, the Sun were matched up against an equally dominant Sacramento Monarchs team. Also against the Sun's luck, Lindsay Whalen played through the series with injuries. The Sun had home-court advantage, but it was of no use; the Sun lost the Finals for the second straight year, 3 games to 1, in the first WNBA Finals played in a best-of-five format.

The success of the franchise was rewarded in 2005, when the Sun were selected to host the annual WNBA All-Star Game. The All-Star game was arguably the most exciting in WNBA history with the two teams combining for 221 points. At the end of the game, Lisa Leslie became the first woman to ever dunk in an All-Star Game.

In 2006, the Sun would match their 2005 record and it looked like a return trip to the Finals was certain. Mike Thibault received the WNBA Coach of the Year Award, and it appeared as if no team could stop the Sun. All five starters were named to the WNBA Eastern Conference All-Star team: Katie Douglas, Margo Dydek, Taj McWilliams-Franklin, Nykesha Sales and Lindsay Whalen. This feat had never before been achieved in WNBA history. In the playoffs, the Sun would quickly sweep the Washington Mystics. But in the Eastern Conference Finals, the Sun were upset by the Detroit Shock, 2 games to 1, on the Sun's home floor.

The Sun stumbled out of the gate in 2007, posting a dismal 5–10 record by late June. However, the Sun stormed back into playoff contention by winning 11 of their next 13 games, to finish the regular season at 18–16, good enough to win the #3 seed in the Eastern Conference. In the playoffs, the Sun faced the Indiana Fever in the first round. The Sun came into the series having won all four regular season contests against the Fever. In Game 1, despite holding a 17-point lead in the third quarter, the Sun allowed the Fever to force the first triple-overtime game in WNBA playoff history, ending with a 93–88 victory for the Sun. However, the Fever would respond by winning the next two games and therefore the series, including a playoff record 22-point come-from-behind win in Game 3.

Brief decline (2008–2009)
The front office knew something had to be done to save the team from another disappointing finish. During the 2007–08 off-season, the Connecticut Sun made major changes to their roster in an effort to win that ever-elusive championship title. The Sun made three trades, one sending Katie Douglas, the face of the franchise, to the Indiana Fever, a deal that signaled the end of the partnership that led the Sun to consecutive WNBA Finals appearances. In return, the Sun received Tamika Whitmore who would surely create a physical presence in the paint, something that the Sun had been lacking in previous years. Following that monumental trade, Nykesha Sales announced she would sit out the 2008 season due to multiple nagging injuries. 7'2" center Margo Dydek also took the season off due to her pregnancy. With three former starters missing from the Sun lineup, most sports critics and publications predicted the team to finish fourth in the East. Some even claimed the Sun would finish sixth, only ahead of the expansion Atlanta Dream.

Contrary to these predictions, the Sun started the season with an outstanding 8–1 record. Soon, however, the team found itself in a disappointing slump. The Sun went on a five-game losing streak, the worst ever for a team under Mike Thibault. The team finished the regular season with a 21–13 record which placed them second in the Eastern Conference, only one game out of first place. In the playoffs, the Sun's youth and inexperience caught up to them; the New York Liberty won game three on the Sun's home floor and for the second straight year, the Sun failed to advance to the Eastern Conference Finals.

Exceeding many expectations during the 2008 rebuilding season, the Sun looked to come back even stronger in 2009.  There was no reason to believe the Sun would not contend for playoff position. During the first six seasons the team has been in Connecticut, the Sun have tied the highest winning record of any team in the WNBA during that time period, posting a record of 127–77, translating into a winning percentage of .623, with the Detroit Shock having the same exact record for those six years.  That success has reflected itself in the team's attendance, which has surged from 6,025 in 2003 to 7,644 in 2008.

The 2009 WNBA All-Star Game was held on July 25 at 3:30pm in the Mohegan Sun Arena. It was the second time the Sun had hosted the game. It was broadcast nationally on ABC (HD). Like the two previous seasons, they would start the season on a struggling note. But they later won 7 out of their next 10 games, putting them in playoff position. Halfway through the season, however, there was a three-way tie for second place which included the Sun, the Dream, and the Mystics. The Sun, plagued by a late-season injury to all-star Asjha Jones missed the playoffs for the first time since moving from Orlando. Sun fans found an unwelcome and unfamiliar ending to the 2009 season. They finished overall with a 16–18 record and finished 6th in the East. After the team was ousted from playoff contention, Thibault said there would be changes.

Charles triggers resurgence (2010–2012)

After a late-season implosion in 2009, head coach Mike Thibault had to make some crucial decisions for a team whose culture completely broke down last year. Connecticut started its rebuilding process quickly, acquiring DeMya Walker in the Monarchs' dispersal draft. The Sun then snagged the first overall pick in the 2010 collegiate draft in a trade with the Minnesota Lynx; a trade that would have the Sun's most recognizable face in starting point guard Lindsay Whalen, along with the second overall pick, shipped to Minneapolis. This package netted the Sun Renee Montgomery, who would prove to be luxury in the deal. Thibault continued to reshape his roster after introducing Kara Lawson at a press conference as a new member of the Sun. Lawson was formerly a member of the Monarchs' team that decimated the Sun's chances of a WNBA title. Lawson, along with Montgomery, formed a backcourt that would be able to dictate pace and bolster the Sun's perimeter arsenal attack. The Sun also signed reserves Anete Jēkabsone-Žogota and Tan White to multiyear contracts to solidify the Sun's revamped backcourt.

The Sun came into the 2010 WNBA Draft with two picks in the first round – the first and seventh overall picks, the latter of which was acquired one day prior to the draft from Tulsa. With its first overall selection in franchise history, the Sun took UConn standout and Player of the Year recipient, Tina Charles, the consensus top prospect available. By playing alongside premier talent at the collegiate level, Charles had shown that she was ready to pilot an offense and lead this franchise into the post-Sales era. After the selection of Charles, Thibault had the remainder of the draft to fortify the weapons around his newly acquired center. To diminish the losses of Amber Holt and Chante Black, both of whom were part of the package deal with the Shock, the Sun selected Kansas product Danielle McCray. Prior to the draft, it was understood that McCray wouldn't be available to participate in the upcoming season due to an ACL injury she sustained in college. There was risk involved concerning her durability, but McCray's potential as a superstar was reason enough to take the leap of faith. The Sun cemented its guard corps with the selection of Allison Hightower in the second round. Thibault wasn't finished making a mark on draft day as he maneuvered around the draft board to address the Sun's suspect defense. He nabbed former Cornhusker Kelsey Griffin, who was taken third overall, in a trade once again involving the Lynx. This trade would have the Sun relinquishing their first and second round picks in next year's draft. The acquisition of coveted players through the draft and free agency capped an off-season of change that had transformed a franchise for the future. Although the reconstruction of the Sun remained a work in progress, this talented class of prospects would serve as the foundation for a team that jumped back into contention quicker than anyone anticipated.

After the 2010 WNBA season, news surfaced that the Connecticut Sun was the first franchise in WNBA history to turn a profit.

The 2011 season started well for the Sun. Few changes were made in the off-season, which gave the team some consistency and a year of experience on which to build. Sandrine Gruda and Anete Jēkabsone-Žogota decided to sit out the season, so the Sun looked elsewhere, adding Jessica Moore and relying on rookie Danielle McCray to step up and score. In a tough Eastern Conference, the Sun held a 9–5 record going into the All-Star break.

In his decade-long pursuit of an elusive title, Mike Thibault found himself in the proverbial hot seat to engineer a deep run. But an absence of urgency was reflected in the team's free agency approach – making small waves to pry Thompson and Cash from their respective teams – to solely ink rugged forward Mistie Mims in relief of Charles. Sticking with the status quo meant the roster was set so much so that the Sun drafted an unheralded Malian prospect. Going into the season, Thibault had assembled a deep roster that necessitated only a couple minor moves to cap the off-season process. The coach's patience paid dividends when his burgeoning core bolted to a 6–1 start highlighted by a chafed Montgomery turning the starting reins over to Hightower. Leading into the 1-month Olympic hiatus, the Sun strung together a five-win streak to improve to a league-best 15–4 mark. Following the ill-timed Games, which saw the club's Jones-Charles tandem help capture gold for Team USA, Connecticut continued to perform superbly while short-handed. They finished the season 25–9, with a better road record (13–4) than as hosts. The Sun fended off late Liberty rallies to sweep their way into a joust with the Fever in what was the team's first Conference finals since 2010's radical facelift. In the series, the Sun took themselves to the doorstep of a Finals berth after notching a decisive Game 1 rout. But building on a stirring two-point Game 2 win and a rally cry after losing Douglas, Indiana derailed the Sun's seemingly predestined trip in a 71–87 home romp, a defeat that essentially cost longtime coach Thibault his job. The lion's share of the season's fortunes came from the talented triumvirate of Lawson, Jones and league MVP Tina Charles flanked by Mims and sixth woman Montgomery carving a niche as an energy duo off the pines. Though failure was what came to mind in taking stock of the team's decade season; the Fever capturing the year's title being emblematic of that.

Change at the top (2013–2016)
On November 20, 2012, Mike Thibault was relieved of his duties as head coach for the franchise. While at the helm, he amassed a 206–134 record en route to 8 playoff appearances, four Eastern Conference titles and reaching the WNBA Finals twice in his ten-year tenure. However, Thibault's squads have had the notoriety for failing to flip their proverbial switch to close games; honing a burgeoning reputation for folding under pressure. This dubious distinction, coupled with the failure of achieving a franchise-first championship, led to the coach's dismissal. With an eye to accomplishing the objective of a WNBA title, the team hired Hall of Famer, Anne Donovan, as Thibault's successor. Among other WNBA stints, Donovan was the head coach of the '04 Seattle Storm team that captured the league title over, ironically, the Sun. Donovan hired Catherine Proto and Jennifer Gillom as her assistant coaches for her initial season. In 2014, Proto became Scouting and Video Operations Manager for the Sun and Steven Key replaced her as an assistant coach. During Anne Donovan's run as head coach she had gone 38-64 in three seasons with the Connecticut Sun before resigning as the head coach in 2015. Curt Miller would be named head coach of the Connecticut Sun starting in the 2016 WNBA Season.

The Sun Rise to the Top (2016–present)
With Curt Miller at the helm of the Connecticut Sun moves had to be made in the off-season to show early signs of improvement. Elizabeth Williams was sent to the Atlanta Dream for the 2016 fourth overall pick in Rachel Banham. In April 2016 the Sun traded Chelsea Gray to the Los Angeles Sparks along with two second round picks in the 2016 WNBA Draft and a 2017 first round pick for Jonquel Jones and the Sparks second round selection in the 2016 WNBA Draft. In the 2016 WNBA Draft, the Connecticut Sun selected Morgan Tuck with their third overall draft pick. After getting three wins in sixteen games on the 2016 season, the Sun moved Kelsey Bone to the Phoenix Mercury for Courtney Williams and a second round draft selection in the 2017 WNBA Draft. Closing out the 2016 WNBA Season the sun would win eleven out of the remaining twenty games finishing with a record of 14-20 missing out on the postseason by three wins. In February 2017, the Sun would trade Camille Little to the Phoenix Mercury for Lynetta Kizer from the Indiana Fever and eighth overall draft selection Brionna Jones in the 2017 WNBA Draft from a three team trade. Ahead of the 2017 WNBA Season, Chiney Ogwumike was suspended due to an injury she suffered overseas causing her to miss the 2017 WNBA Season. It would only take a 1-5 record in the month of May to turn the early start of the season around for Connecticut finishing with 6-2 and 7-2 record in June, July, and August to clinch a playoff spot. The Sun would finish the season going 21-13 just one win short of tying the New York Liberty for the Eastern Conference Regular Season Title. With the recent changes in 2016 to the playoff format, Connecticut got a bye to the second round of the WNBA Playoffs against the Phoenix Mercury. The Sun went on to lose their second round game 88-83 and despite that loss more success was soon to come. Chiney returned to action in the 2018 WNBA Season while Stricklen resigned for another run with the Connecticut Sun.

Current home
The Sun play in the Mohegan Sun Arena. Mohegan Sun is owned by the Mohegan tribe. The arena is located at Mohegan Sun Casino in Uncasville, Connecticut. Despite the inclusion of “Connecticut” in the name, the team technically isn’t under the jurisdiction of the State of Connecticut as Native American tribes are sovereign entities and  the Mohegan Sun Arena is located on the Mohegan reservation, though the team is still considered to be located in Connecticut. Mohegan Sun Arena is smaller than most other WNBA arenas, with the maximum capacity (lower and upper levels) for a basketball game being 9,323. The Sun is one of the only top-level professional sports franchises located in the state of Connecticut, along with the Connecticut Whale of the Premier Hockey Federation, which are located in Danbury. The New England Black Wolves of the National Lacrosse League formerly shared the Mohegan Sun Arena with the Sun until their relocation in 2020. 

The Mohegan Sun Arena is located in the center of the mall area of the Mohegan Sun Casino.

Uniforms
1999–2002: For home games, the Miracle wore white with blue on the sides/shoulders and white Miracle logo text on the chest. For away games, blue with white on the sides and white Miracle logo text on the chest. The Miracle logo is on the shorts.
2003: For home games, the Sun wore white with sun red on the sides and red Sun logo text emblazoned on the chest. For away games, pure red with gold trim on the sides and gold Sun logo text on the chest. The Sun logo is on the shorts.
2004–2006: For home games, the Sun wore white with sun red on the sides and red Sun logo text on the chest. For away games, blue with sun red and gold trim on the sides, as well as gold Sun logo text on the chest. The Sun logo is on the shorts.
2007: For home games, the Sun wore white with images of basic suns embellished on the sides and the Sun logo text on the chest. For away games, blue with images of basic suns on the sides and gold Sun logo text on the chest. The Sun logo is on the shorts.
2008–2010: For home games, the Sun wore white with the word "Connecticut" printed vertically on the sides and the Sun logo text emblazoned on the chest. For away games, the Sun wore blue with the word "Sun" printed vertically on the sides and the gold "Connecticut" text on the chest. The Sun logo is on the shorts.
2011–2015: For home games, the Sun wear white with blue vertical stripes on the sides and the Sun logo text emblazoned on the chest. For away games, the Sun wear blue with white vertical stripes embellished on the sides and gold "Connecticut" text on the chest. The Sun logo is shown on the left shoulder.
2015–present: Frontier Communications takes over as jersey sponsor.
2016: As part of a league-wide initiative for its 20th season, all games featured all-color uniform matchups. Therefore, the Sun unveiled an orange uniform while retaining the blue jersey from the previous season.

Season-by-season records

Players

Current roster

International rights

Honored numbers

FIBA Hall of Fame

Management, coaches and staff

Owners
RDV Sports, Inc., owner of the Orlando Magic (1998–2002)
Mohegan Sun (2003–present)

Head coaches

General managers
Carolyn Peck (1998–2001)
Dee Brown (2002)
Chris Sienko (2003–2016) 
Curt Miller (2016–2022)
Darius Taylor (2023–Present)

Assistant coaches

Rick Stukes (1999–2000)
Charlene Thomas-Swinson (1999–2001)
Michael Peck (2001)
Vonn Read (2002)
Valerie Still (2002)
Bernadette Mattox (2003–2012)
Scott Hawk (2003–2012)
Catherine Proto (2013)
Jennifer Gillom (2013–2015)
Steven Key (2014–2015)
Nicki Collen (2016–2017)
Steve Smith (2016–2018)
Brandi Poole (2018–2022)
Chris Koclanes (2019–2022)
Abi Olajuwon (2023–present)
Briann January (2023–present)

Statistics

|-
| 1999
| S. Johnson (14.0)
| T. McWilliams (7.5)
| S. Johnson (4.4)
| 68.9 vs 69.3
| 30.2 vs 31.4
| .424 vs .429
|-

|-
| 2000
| T. McWilliams (13.7)
| T. McWilliams (7.6)
| S. Johnson (5.3)
| 69.0 vs 69.8
| 28.9 vs 31.8
| .436 vs .433
|-
| 2001
| N. Sales (13.5)
| T. McWilliams (7.6)
| E. Powell (3.1)
| 66.9 vs 68.9
| 30.3 vs 30.5
| .401 vs .440
|-
| 2002
| S. Johnson (16.1)
| W. Palmer (5.8)
| S. Johnson (5.3)
| 70.4 vs 70.5
| 28.6 vs 32.7
| .422 vs .432
|-
| 2003
| N. Sales (16.1)
| T. McWilliams (6.7)
| S. Johnson (5.8)
| 70.1 vs 70.9
| 32.2 vs 34.6
| .411 vs .411
|-
| 2004
| N. Sales (15.2)
| T. McWilliams (7.2)
| L. Whalen (4.8)
| 68.7 vs 67.8
| 30.7 vs 31.3
| .427 vs .430
|-
| 2005
| N. Sales (15.6)
| T. McWilliams (7.3)
| L. Whalen (5.1)
| 72.8 vs 66.0
| 32.6 vs 31.7
| .452 vs .398
|-
| 2006
| K. Douglas (16.4)
| T. McWilliams (9.6)
| L. Whalen (4.6)
| 78.9 vs 71.1
| 37.3 vs 33.9
| .443 vs .402
|-
| 2007
| K. Douglas (17.0)
| M. Dydek (6.5)
| L. Whalen (5.0)
| 78.7 vs 76.3
| 35.9 vs 34.7
| .430 vs .421
|-
| 2008
| A. Jones (17.0)
| A. Jones (6.1)
| L. Whalen (5.4)
| 79.1 vs 74.7
| 36.4 vs 35.3
| .422 vs .418
|-
| 2009
| A. Jones (16.7)
| S. Gruda (6.3)
| L. Whalen (4.6)
| 78.0 vs 78.1
| 34.8 vs 37.5
| .406 vs .426
|-

|-
| 2010
| T. Charles (15.5)
| T. Charles (11.7)
| R. Montgomery (4.1)
| 81.0 vs 79.9
| 36.5 vs 35.6
| .427 vs .433
|-
| 2011
| T. Charles (17.6)
| T. Charles (11.0)
| R. Montgomery (4.9)
| 80.1 vs 76.8
| 35.6 vs 36.5
| .424 vs .429
|-
| 2012
| T. Charles (18.0)
| T. Charles (10.5)
| K. Lawson (4.0)
| 81.6 vs 77.4
| 34.4 vs 35.3
| .431 vs .430
|-
| 2013
| T. Charles (18.0)
| T. Charles (10.1)
| K. Lawson (4.2)
| 71.0 vs 76.9
| 33.9 vs 37.6
| .400 vs .436
|-
| 2014
| C. Ogwumike (15.5)
| C. Ogwumike (8.5)
| A. Bentley (3.7)
| 75.7 vs 77.5
| 33.9 vs 33.6
| .415 vs .443
|-
| 2015
| K. Bone (15.4)
| K. Bone (6.3)
| J. Thomas (3.9)
| 75.0 vs 76.6
| 31.0 vs 33.6
| .422 vs .440
|-
| 2016
| A. Bentley (12.9)
| C. Ogwumike (6.7)
| J. Thomas (5.1)
| 83.0 vs 84.4
| 34.1 vs 33.9
| .439 vs .459
|-
| 2017
| J. Jones (15.4)
| J. Jones (11.9)
| A. Thomas (4.5)
| 86.0 vs 81.6
| 36.7 vs 33.8
| .448 vs .435
|-
| 2018
| C. Ogwumike (14.4)
| A. Thomas (8.1)
| J. Thomas (4.8)
| 87.6 vs 81.7
| 36.9 vs 32.0
| .466 vs .443
|-
| 2019
| J. Jones (14.6)
| J. Jones (9.7)
| J. Thomas (5.1)
| 80.8 vs 77.9
| 36.8 vs 33.3
| .423 vs .439
|-

|-
| 2020
| D. Bonner (19.7)
| A. Thomas (9.0)
| A. Thomas (4.8)
| 80.4 vs 79.9
| 35.5 vs 33.0
| .427 vs .443
|-
| 2021
| J. Jones (19.4)
| J. Jones (11.2)
| J. Thomas (4.0)
| 79.7 vs 69.9
| 36.6 vs 27.3
| .444 vs .409
|-
| 2022
| J. Jones (14.6)
| J. Jones (8.6)
| A. Thomas (6.1)
| 85.8 vs 77.8
| 37.1 vs 29.0
| .462 vs .439

Media coverage
As of the 2021 season the television home of the Sun is NESN. For the 2021 season NESN will air 22 games, 7 on the regular network and 15 on NESN+.

Previously, Connecticut Sun games aired on WCTX (MyTV 9), a local television station for the state of Connecticut. It was the second time WCTX had aired Sun matches. They were also the original home of Sun matches prior to the 2010 season. More often than not, NBA TV picked up the feed from the local broadcast, which are shown nationally. Broadcasters for the Sun games on WCTX consisted of Bob Heussler and Rebecca Lobo, Jennifer Rizzotti or Kara Wolters. From 2012–2014 Sun games were broadcast on CPTV Sports (CPTV-S). For the 2011 season, Sun games were broadcast on Comcast Sports Net New England, with Mike Gorman as an announcer. In addition to Mike Gorman, broadcasters in the past have included Leah Secondo and Kara Wolters.

Audio broadcasts for all home games are done by Bob Heussler, which (excluding blackout games, in which case are available on ESPN3.com) are streamed to the WNBA League Pass game feeds on the league website. Furthermore, some Sun games are broadcast nationally on CBS, CBS Sports Network, ESPN, ESPN2 and ABC. The WNBA has reached an eight-year agreement with ESPN, which will pay right fees to the Sun, as well as other teams in the league.

All-time notes

Regular season attendance
A sellout for a basketball game at TD Waterhouse Centre (Orlando) is 17,248.
A sellout for a basketball game at Mohegan Sun Arena (Connecticut) is:
 9,518 from 2003–2010.
 9,323 since 2011.

Draft picks
1999 Expansion Draft: Andrea Congreaves (2), Kisha Ford (4), Yolanda Moore (6), Adrienne Johnson (8)
1999: Tari Phillips (8), Sheri Sam (20), Taj McWilliams-Franklin (32), Carla McGhee (44), Elaine Powell (50)
2000: Cintia dos Santos (4), Jannon Roland (20), Shawnetta Stewart (36), Romana Hamzová (52)
2001: Katie Douglas (10), Brooke Wyckoff (26), Jaclyn Johnson (42), Anne Thorius (58)
2002: Davalyn Cunningham (23), Saundra Jackson (39), Tomeka Brown (55)
2003 Miami/Portland Dispersal Draft: Debbie Black (6)
2003: Courtney Coleman (13), Lindsey Wilson (34)
2004 Cleveland Dispersal Draft: selection traded
2004: Lindsay Whalen (4), Jessica Brungo (16), Ugo Oha (24), Candace Futrell (29)
2005: Katie Feenstra (8), Erin Phillips (21), Megan Mahoney (34)
2006: Debbie Merrill (28), Marita Payne (42)
2007 Charlotte Dispersal Draft: selection waived
2007: Kamesha Hairston (12), Sandrine Gruda (13), Cori Chambers (26), Kiera Hardy (39)
2008: Amber Holt (9), Ketia Swanier (12), Jolene Anderson (23), Lauren Ervin (37)
2009 Houston Dispersal Draft: selection waived
2009: Chante Black (10), Lyndra Littles (17), Alba Torrens (36)
2010 Sacramento Dispersal Draft: DeMya Walker (3)
2010: Tina Charles (1), Danielle McCray (7), Allison Hightower (15), Johannah Leedham (27)
2011: Sydney Colson (16), Adrienne Johnson (28)
2012: Astan Dabo (9), Chay Shegog (21)
2013: Kelly Faris (11), Anna Prins (23), Andrea Smith (35)
2014: Chiney Ogwumike (1), Chelsea Gray (11), DeNesha Stallworth (25)
2015: Elizabeth Williams (4), Brittany Hrynko (19)
2016: Morgan Tuck (3), Rachel Banham (4), Jamie Weisner (17), Aliyyah Handford (27)
2017: Brionna Jones (8), Shayla Cooper (13), Leticia Romero (16), Jessica January (28)
2018: Lexie Brown (9), Mikayla Cowling (33)
2019: Kristine Anigwe (9), Bridget Carleton (21), Regan Magarity (33)
2020: Kaila Charles (23), Juicy Landrum(35)
2021: DiJonai Carrington (20), Micaela Kelly (21), Aleah Goodman (30)
2022 Nia Clouden (12), Jordan Lewis (24), Kiara Smith (36)

Trades
April 18, 2002: The Miracle acquired Clarisse Machanguana from the Charlotte Sting in exchange for a first-round pick (7th overall) in the 2002 Draft.
July 8, 2002: The Miracle traded Elaine Powell and a first round pick (5th overall) in the 2003 Draft in exchange for Wendy Palmer and a second round pick in the 2003 Draft.
February 14, 2003: The Sun acquired Rebecca Lobo from the Houston Comets for a second round pick in the 2003 Draft.
January 28, 2004: The Sun traded Shannon Johnson, along with the 21st and 34th picks in the 2004 Draft, to the San Antonio Silver Stars in exchange for the fourth, 16th, and 29th picks in the 2004 Draft.
March 25, 2004: The Sun acquired Asjha Jones from the Washington Mystics in exchange for the eighth pick in the 2004 Draft in a three-way trade that also involved the Phoenix Mercury.
April 16, 2005: The Sun acquired Margo Dydek from the San Antonio Silver Stars in exchange for Katie Feenstra and a first-round pick (14th overall) in the 2006 Draft.
February 21, 2007: The Sun traded Taj McWilliams-Franklin to the Los Angeles Sparks in exchange for Erika DeSouza and a first-round pick (12th overall) in the 2007 Draft.
February 19, 2008: The Sun traded Katie Douglas to the Indiana Fever in exchange for Tamika Whitmore, the rights to Jessica Foley and a first-round pick (12th overall) in the 2008 Draft.
March 6, 2008: The Sun acquired Barbara Turner from the Houston Comets in exchange for Megan Mahoney.
March 14, 2008: The Sun traded Kristen Rasmussen to the Minnesota Lynx in exchange for Tamika Raymond, as well as the option to trade second-round picks in the 2009 Draft.
January 12, 2010: The Sun traded Lindsay Whalen and the second pick in the 2010 Draft to the Minnesota Lynx in exchange for Renee Montgomery and the first overall pick in the 2010 Draft.
April 7, 2010: The Sun traded Amber Holt and Chante Black to the Tulsa Shock in exchange for the seventh pick in the 2010 Draft and a second-round pick in the 2011 Draft.
April 8, 2010: The Sun traded first and second-round picks (4th and 13th overall) in the 2011 Draft to the Minnesota Lynx in exchange for the draft rights to Kelsey Griffin.
April 11, 2011: The Sun traded their third-round pick in the 2012 Draft to the Phoenix Mercury in exchange for the draft rights to Tahnee Robinson.
April 11, 2011: The Sun acquired Kalana Greene from the New York Liberty in exchange for the draft rights to Sydney Colson.
June 20, 2013: The Sun traded their second-round pick in the 2014 Draft to the Tulsa Shock in exchange for Kayla Pedersen.
March 12, 2014: The Sun traded Kara Lawson to the Washington Mystics in exchange for Alex Bentley from the Atlanta Dream.
April 14, 2014: The Sun traded Tina Charles to the New York Liberty in exchange for Kelsey Bone, Alyssa Thomas, and a first-round pick in the 2015 Draft.
January 28, 2015: The Sun traded Renee Montgomery and their third and fifteen overall picks in the 2015 Draft to the Seattle Storm in exchange for Camille Little and Shekinna Stricklen.
April 16, 2015: The Sun traded Brittany Hrynko to the Atlanta Dream in exchange for Jasmine Thomas.
May 13, 2015: The Sun traded Asjha Jones to the Minnesota Lynx in exchange for a second-round pick in the 2016 Draft.
February 3, 2016: The Sun traded Elizabeth Williams to the Atlanta Dream in exchange for the fourth pick in the 2016 Draft.
April 14, 2016: The Sun traded Chelsea Gray, the 15th and 23rd picks in the 2016 Draft, and a first-round pick in the 2017 Draft to the Los Angeles Sparks in exchange for Jonquel Jones and the 17th pick in the 2016 Draft.
June 25, 2016: The Sun traded Kelsey Bone to the Phoenix Mercury in exchange for Courtney Williams, Jillian Alleyne, and San Antonio's second-round pick in the 2017 Draft.
January 26, 2017: The Sun traded Aneika Henry-Morello to the Atlanta Dream in exchange for Reshanda Gray.
February 21, 2017: The Sun traded Camille Little and the rights to Jillian Alleyne to the Phoenix Mercury in exchange for Lynetta Kizer and the 8th overall pick in the 2017 Draft. The trade was a three-way trade between the Sun, the Mercury and the Indiana Fever.
June 8, 2017: The Sun traded Jordan Hooper to the Atlanta Dream for the Dream's 2018 2nd Round Draft Pick.
February 2, 2018: The Sun traded the 21st pick in the 2018 Draft to Phoenix in exchange for Cayla George.
April 12, 2018: The Sun traded the 15th pick in the 2018 Draft and their second round pick in the 2019 Draft to Atlanta in exchange for Bria Holmes.
July 9, 2018: The Sun traded Alex Bentley to Atlanta for Layshia Clarendon and a second round pick in the 2019 Draft.
April 10, 2019: The Sun traded Lexie Brown to Minnesota in exchange for Natisha Hiedeman.
April 27, 2019: The Sun traded Chiney Ogwumike to Los Angeles in exchange for the Sparks' first round pick in the 2020 WNBA draft.
August 6, 2019: The Sun traded Kristine Anigwe to Dallas in exchange for Theresa Plaisance.
February 10, 2020: The Sun traded their first round pick in the 2020 WNBA draft and Morgan Tuck to Seattle for Seattle's first round pick in the 2020 WNBA draft.
February 11, 2020: The Sun traded the 7th and the 10th picks in the 2020 WNBA draft and their first round pick in the 2021 WNBA draft to Phoenix Mercury in exchange for DeWanna Bonner.
February 19, 2020: The Sun traded Courtney Williams as part of a three team trade where they acquired Briann January and a second round pick in the 2020 WNBA draft.
February 24, 2020: The Sun traded a second round pick in the 2021 WNBA draft to Seattle in exchange for Kaleena Mosqueda-Lewis.
February 25, 2020: The Sun traded Rachel Banham to Minnesota in exchange for a second round pick in the 2021 WNBA draft.

Franchise records and player accolades

Franchise leaders

Games played: Nykesha Sales (278)
Consecutive games played: Nykesha Sales (248, 6/10/99-7/6/06)
Minutes: Nykesha Sales (8,762)
Minutes per game: Shannon Johnson (34.0)
Points: Nykesha Sales (3,955)
Points per game: Tina Charles (18.0)
Consecutive games scoring: Taj McWilliams-Franklin (243, 6/10/99-8/13/06)
Field goal % (minimum 100): Margo Dydek (462–1,032, .503)
Three point % (minimum 50): Kara Lawson (140–345, .409)
Free throw % (minimum 100): Kara Lawson (164–182, .900)

Rebounds: Taj McWilliams-Franklin (1,814)
Rebounds per game: Tina Charles (11.7)
Assists: Lindsay Whalen (808)
Assists per game: Lindsay Whalen (5.0)
Steals: Nykesha Sales (490)
Steals per game: Nykesha Sales (1.76)
Blocks: Taj McWilliams-Franklin (267)
Blocks per game: Margo Dydek (2.26)
Personal fouls: Nykesha Sales (798)
Turnovers: Nykesha Sales (578)

Individual honors

WNBA Most Valuable Player
Tina Charles – 2012
Jonquel Jones –2021

All–WNBA First Team
Katie Douglas – 2006
Lindsay Whalen – 2008
Tina Charles – 2011, 2012
Jonquel Jones – 2021

All–WNBA Second Team
Shannon Johnson – 1999, 2000, 2002
Nykesha Sales – 2004
Taj McWilliams-Franklin – 2005, 2006
Katie Douglas – 2007
Asjha Jones – 2008
Tina Charles – 2010, 2013
Jonquel Jones – 2017, 2019, 2022
DeWanna Bonner – 2020
Alyssa Thomas – 2022

WNBA All–Star Game MVP
Katie Douglas – 2006

WNBA Most Improved Player
Wendy Palmer – 2004
Kelsey Bone – 2015
Jonquel Jones – 2017
Brionna Jones – 2021

WNBA Sixth Woman of the Year
Renee Montgomery – 2012
Jonquel Jones – 2018
Brionna Jones – 2022

WNBA Coach of the Year
Mike Thibault – 2006, 2008
Curt Miller – 2017, 2021

WNBA Basketball Executive of the Year
Curt Miller – 2017

WNBA All–Defensive First Team
Katie Douglas – 2005, 2006, 2007
Jasmine Thomas – 2017, 2018, 2019
Jonquel Jones – 2019, 2021
Alyssa Thomas – 2020
Briann January – 2021

WNBA All–Defensive Second Team
Taj McWilliams-Franklin – 2005
Margo Dydek – 2006, 2007
Tina Charles – 2011, 2012
Jasmine Thomas – 2016, 2021
Alyssa Thomas – 2017, 2019, 2022
Brionna Jones – 2021
Jonquel Jones – 2022

WNBA Rookie of the Year
Tina Charles – 2010
Chiney Ogwumike – 2014
WNBA All–Rookie Team
Amber Holt – 2008
Tina Charles – 2010
Kelsey Griffin – 2010
Chiney Ogwumike – 2014
Alyssa Thomas – 2014

Kim Perrot Sportsmanship
Taj McWilliams-Franklin – 2005
Kara Lawson – 2012

WNBA Peak Performers
Lindsay Whalen (Assists) – 2008
Tina Charles (Rebounds) – 2010, 2011, 2012
Jonquel Jones – 2017

All–Stars
1999: Shannon Johnson, Taj McWilliams-Franklin, Nykesha Sales
2000: Shannon Johnson, Taj McWilliams-Franklin, Nykesha Sales
2001: Taj McWilliams-Franklin, Nykesha Sales
2002: Shannon Johnson, Nykesha Sales
2003: Shannon Johnson, Nykesha Sales
2004: Taj McWilliams-Franklin, Nykesha Sales, Lindsay Whalen
2005: Taj McWilliams-Franklin, Nykesha Sales
2006: Katie Douglas, Margo Dydek, Taj McWilliams-Franklin, Nykesha Sales, Lindsay Whalen
2007: Katie Douglas, Asjha Jones
2008: No All-Star Game
2009: Asjha Jones
2010: Tina Charles, Renee Montgomery
2011: Tina Charles, Renee Montgomery
2012: No All-Star Game
2013: Tina Charles, Allison Hightower
2014: Katie Douglas, Chiney Ogwumike
2015: Alex Bentley, Kelsey Bone
2016: No All-Star Game
2017: Jasmine Thomas, Jonquel Jones, Alyssa Thomas
2018: Chiney Ogwumike
2019: Jonquel Jones, Alyssa Thomas
2020: No All-Star Game
2021: DeWanna Bonner, Brionna Jones, Jonquel Jones
2022: Brionna Jones, Jonquel Jones, Alyssa Thomas

Olympic team selection
 Erin Phillips – 2008 
 Tina Charles – 2012 
 Asjha Jones – 2012

Notes

References

External links
 
 Official CT Announcement Transcript

 
Basketball teams established in 2003
Basketball teams in Connecticut
Sports in Uncasville, Connecticut
Women's National Basketball Association teams
2003 establishments in Connecticut
Relocated Women's National Basketball Association teams